Sahray-ye Bagh District (meaning "Desert Garden") is a district (bakhsh) in Larestan County, Fars Province, Iran. At the 2006 census, its population was 13,389, in 2,833 families.  The District has one city Emad Deh. The District has two rural districts (dehestan): Emad Deh Rural District and Sahray-ye Bagh Rural District.

References 

Larestan County
Districts of Fars Province